Grzegorz Damięcki (born 15 November 1967) is a Polish theatre, television, and film actor from Warsaw best known to international audiences for his role in the Netflix series The Woods.

Biography

Early life
Born in Warsaw, Grzegorz Damięcki comes from a family of actors and filmmakers. He is the son of director Barbara Borys-Damięcka and actor Damian Damięcki, the grandson of actors Irena Górska-Damięcka and Dobiesław Damięcki, nephew of actor Maciej Damięcki, and cousin of actors Matylda Damięcka and Mateusz Damięcki.

He is a graduate of the XXII Secondary School of General Jose Marti in Warsaw and in 1991, received his degree from the Aleksander Zelwerowicz National Academy of Dramatic Art in Warsaw.

Career
Damięcki made his stage debut in 1991 at the Ateneum Theatre in Warsaw.

In 2020, he was cast in the Netflix series The Woods in the lead role of prosecutor Paweł Kopiński.

Personal life
Damięcki is married to Dominika Laskowska. They have three children together.

Selected filmography

Film

Television

References

External links

 

1967 births
People from Warsaw
21st-century Polish male actors
Polish male television actors
Polish male film actors
Living people